Endotricha thermidora is a species of snout moth in the genus Endotricha. It was described by George Hampson in 1916, and is known from New Guinea, Admiralty Island, Yamma Island, the Solomon Islands, New Hannover, Dampier Island, New Britain, and Sudest Island.

References

Endotrichini
Moths described in 1916